Dirty Bomb is a collaborative album under the name KGC, a collaboration between Sascha Konietzko and Lucia Cifarelli of KMFDM and Dean Garcia of Curve, released in 2006.

It was released on KMFDM Records (KMFDM004 - CD)

Reception

The critical reception was variable. Release Magazine noted that Garcia had "never been catchier and his unique combination of hip/hop beats and that slithery bass are firmly on point." Inside Pulse described it as sounding "like KMFDM" second-string tracks, and called it "less of a bad effort and more of a disappointment."

Track listing
All tracks by Lucia Cifarelli

"Ever After" - 4:16
"6 ft Below" - 3:44
"Katatonic" - 3:34
"Best of Everything" - 3:55
"Back to Life" - 3:56
"Good Things" - 4:02
"Made 4 Luv" - 4:15
"Misery" - 4:13
"Barely Cold" - 3:30
"Back to the Front (Feel Love)" - 5:41

Total playing time: 41:06

Personnel
Lucia Cifarelli – vocals, mixing, production
Dean Garcia – writing, composition, bass, drums, guitars, keyboards, programming, various electronica, recording, engineering, production
Sascha Konietzko – writing, composition, analogue synths, bass and guitar, loop enforcement, recording, engineering, production, mixing

Additional personnel
DOLK  – art
Brian Gardner – mastering at Bernie Grundman Mastering
Jules Hodgson – various guitars, bass
Phil Knott – dean photo
Chris McCormack – additional composition on 2 and 3, very noisy guitar
Karen Moskowitz – sascha photo
Adrienne Thiessen (Gemini Visuals Photography) – lucia photo
Vibrent Management – project management
Patrick Volkmar – layout

References

2006 albums
KGC (band) albums